Joseph Conrad Square is a small triangular square at Columbus Avenue and Beach Street, near Fisherman's Wharf in San Francisco, California.

History
The park was dedicated in 1971 by then Mayor Joseph Alioto and was named for sailor and novelist Joseph Conrad.  The project had been initiated by Wanda Tomczykowska, president of the Polish Arts and Culture Foundation.  

Consideration was given to placing in the park the San Francisco Maritime Museum's copy of Jacob Epstein's 1924 bronze bust of Conrad, but the sculpture remains at the Museum due to concerns about potential vandalization if placed at the park.

External links

 Google map showing location of Joseph Conrad Square.

Squares in San Francisco
Joseph Conrad